Great Ashby is a civil parish in Stevenage in the North Hertfordshire district, in the county of Hertfordshire, England.

The name Great Ashby was coined in the 1990s to apply to an area of new housing development on the north-eastern edge of the urban area of Stevenage. The development was partly within the borough of Stevenage and partly in the district of North Hertfordshire. A Great Ashby civil parish was created on 1 April 2011 covering the parts of Great Ashby which were within the parish of Graveley in North Hertfordshire. The area of the parish was enlarged a year later on 1 April 2012 to also include an area from the parish of Weston in North Hertfordshire. The council for the parish is called Great Ashby Community Council.

In the 2011 census, the population of Great Ashby was 5,701.

References

External links

Great Ashby Online
Great Ashby Community Church

Civil parishes in Hertfordshire
North Hertfordshire District